Lasiodora is a genus of tarantulas that was first described by Ludwig Carl Christian Koch in 1850. They are found in South America, including the countries of Brazil, Bolivia, Costa Rica, Argentina and Uruguay.

Diagnosis 
This genus can be distinguished from other tarantulas by the presence of hairs used for stridulation on the upper area of the coxae of leg 1 and 2. Males also own a triangular keel below the apex of the palpal bulb, females also have a sclerotized (hardened by sclerotin) area between the two sections of the spermathecae.

Species
 it contains thirty-three species, found in Uruguay, Argentina, Bolivia, Brazil, and Costa Rica:
Lasiodora acanthognatha Mello-Leitão, 1921 – Brazil
Lasiodora benedeni Bertkau, 1880 – Brazil
Lasiodora boliviana (Simon, 1892) – Bolivia
Lasiodora brevibulba (Valerio, 1980) – Costa Rica
Lasiodora carinata (Valerio, 1980) – Costa Rica
Lasiodora citharacantha Mello-Leitão, 1921 – Brazil
Lasiodora cristata (Mello-Leitão, 1923) – Brazil
Lasiodora cryptostigma Mello-Leitão, 1921 – Brazil
Lasiodora curtior Chamberlin, 1917 – Brazil
Lasiodora differens Chamberlin, 1917 – Brazil
Lasiodora difficilis Mello-Leitão, 1921 – Brazil
Lasiodora dolichosterna Mello-Leitão, 1921 – Brazil
Lasiodora dulcicola Mello-Leitão, 1921 – Brazil
Lasiodora erythrocythara Mello-Leitão, 1921 – Brazil
Lasiodora fallax (Bertkau, 1880) – Brazil
Lasiodora fracta Mello-Leitão, 1921 – Brazil
Lasiodora icecu (Valerio, 1980) – Costa Rica
Lasiodora isabellina (Ausserer, 1871) – Brazil
Lasiodora itabunae Mello-Leitão, 1921 – Brazil
Lasiodora klugi (C. L. Koch, 1841) (type) – Brazil
Lasiodora lakoi Mello-Leitão, 1943 – Brazil
Lasiodora mariannae Mello-Leitão, 1921 – Brazil
Lasiodora moreni (Holmberg, 1876) – Argentina
Lasiodora pantherina (Keyserling, 1891) – Brazil
Lasiodora parahybana Mello-Leitão, 1917 – Brazil
Lasiodora pleoplectra Mello-Leitão, 1921 – Brazil
Lasiodora puriscal (Valerio, 1980) – Costa Rica
Lasiodora rubitarsa (Valerio, 1980) – Costa Rica
Lasiodora saeva (Walckenaer, 1837) – Uruguay
Lasiodora spinipes Ausserer, 1871 – Brazil
Lasiodora sternalis (Mello-Leitão, 1923) – Brazil
Lasiodora striatipes (Ausserer, 1871) – Brazil
Lasiodora subcanens Mello-Leitão, 1921 – Brazil

Transferred to other genera

See also
 List of Theraphosidae species

References

Theraphosidae genera
Spiders of Central America
Spiders of South America
Taxa named by Carl Ludwig Koch
Theraphosidae